Ian Tattersall (born 1945) is a British-born American paleoanthropologist and a curator emeritus with the American Museum of Natural History in New York City, New York. In addition to human evolution, Tattersall has worked extensively with lemurs. Tattersall is currently working with the Templeton Foundation.

Early life and education
Tattersall was born in 1945 in the United Kingdom, and grew up in eastern Africa. He trained in archaeology and anthropology at the University of Cambridge, and earned his PhD from Yale University in 1971.

Career
Tattersall has concentrated his research over the past quarter-century on the analysis of the human fossil record and the study of the ecology and systematics of the lemurs of Madagascar, and is considered a leader in both areas.

Tattersall believed that existing literature was not an adequate resource for comparing human fossils because of the many terminological variations. As a result, Tattersall and research associate Jeffrey Schwartz set out to document major fossils in the human fossil record. Their resulting three-volume work, Human Fossil Record, employs a consistent descriptive and photographic protocol, thus making it possible for individuals to make necessary fossil comparisons without the extensive travel that was once needed to consult original fossil findings.

Tattersall maintains that the notion of human evolution as a linear trudge from primitivism to perfection is incorrect. Whereas the Darwinian approach to evolution may be viewed as a fine-tuning of characteristics guided by natural selection, Tattersall takes a more generalist view. Tattersall claims that individual organisms are mind-bogglingly complex and integrated mechanisms; they succeed or fail as the sum of their parts, and not because of a particular characteristic. In terms of human evolution, Tattersall believes the process was more a matter of evolutionary experimentation in which a new species entered the environment, competed with other life forms, and either succeeded, failed, or became extinct within that environment: "To put it in perspective, consider the fact that the history of diversity and competition among human species began some five million years ago when there were at least four different human species living on the same landscape. Yet as a result of evolutionary experimentation, only one species has prospered and survived. One human species is now the only twig on what was once a big branching bush of different species." This idea differs from the typical view that homo sapiens is the pinnacle of an evolutionary ladder that humanity's ancestors laboriously climbed.

Tattersall is also continuing his independent inquiries into the nature and emergence of modern human cognition. He completed a book of essays on the subject, The Monkey in the Mirror: Essays on the Science of What Makes Us Human. Tattersall has over 200 scientific research publications, as well as more than a dozen trade books to his credit. As curator, he has also been responsible for several major exhibits at the American Museum of Natural History, including: Ancestors: Four Million Years of Humanity (1984), and Dark Caves, Bright Visions: Life In Ice Age Europe.

He serves on the executive board of the Institute of Human Origins and is a member of the Lemur Conservation Foundation's Scientific Advisory Council. (https://www.lemurreserve.org/about-lcf/experts/)

Awards and recognition
 W. W. Howells Prize of the American Anthropological Association, 2000 (for Becoming Human: Evolution and Human Uniqueness)
 Monuments Conservancy Perennial Wisdom Award, 1999
 Institute of Human Origins Lifetime Achievement Award, 1993

Bibliography
 Understanding Human Evolution. Cambridge University Press. 2022
 
 
 
 
 
 Paleoanthropology: The Last Half-Century Evolutionary Anthropology 9, no. 1 (2000): 2–16.
 
 The Human Chin Revisited: What Is It and Who Has It? Journal of Human Evolution 38 (2000): 367–409.
 Hominids and Hybrids: The Place of Neanderthals in Human Evolution. I. Tattersall & J. Schwartz, Proceedings of the National Academy of Sciences, U.S.A. 96 (1999): 7117–7119.
 
 The Last Neanderthal: The Rise, Success, and Mysterious Extinction of Our Closest Human Relative. New York: Macmillan, 1995 (republished by Westview Press, 1999).

References

External links
 Ian Tattersall at the AMNH
 Ian Tattersall at Citizendium

1945 births
American anthropologists
American anthropology writers
American male non-fiction writers
American paleontologists
British emigrants to the United States
Human evolution theorists
Living people
American paleoanthropologists
People associated with the American Museum of Natural History
British palaeontologists
Yale University alumni